The Consensus 1980 College Basketball All-American team, as determined by aggregating the results of four major All-American teams.  To earn "consensus" status, a player must win honors from a majority of the following teams: the Associated Press, the USBWA, The United Press International and the National Association of Basketball Coaches.

1980 Consensus All-America team

Individual All-America teams

AP Honorable Mention:

 Danny Ainge, BYU
 Gene Banks, Duke
 Earl Belcher, St. Bonaventure
 Kim Belton, Stanford
 Curtis Berry, Missouri
 Roosevelt Bouie, Syracuse
 Boo Bowers, American
 Sam Bowie, Kentucky
 Kevin Boyle, Iowa
 Clyde Bradshaw, DePaul
 Ricardo Brown, Pepperdine
 Rickey Brown, Mississippi State
 Don Carfino, USC
 Sam Clancy, Pittsburgh
 Darwin Cook, Portland
 Ron Cornelius, Pacific
 Terry Cummings, DePaul
 Kenny Cunningham, Western Michigan
 Larry Drew, Missouri
 John Duren, Georgetown
 Rod Foster, UCLA
 Calvin Garrett, Oral Roberts
 Sidney Green, UNLV
 Rufus Harris, Maine
 Ernie Hill, Oklahoma City
 Reggie Johnson, Tennessee
 Steve Johnson, Oregon State
 Jeff Lamp, Virginia
 Rudy Macklin, LSU
 Ethan Martin, LSU
 Jim McCloskey, Loyola Marymount
 Kevin McHale, Minnesota
 Jack Moore, Nebraska
 Tony Murphy, Southern
 Carl Nicks, Indiana State
 Kurt Nimphius, Arizona State
 Mike O'Koren, North Carolina
 Louis Orr, Syracuse
 Mike Perry, Richmond
 Ron Perry, Holy Cross
 Wally Rank, San Jose State
 Kelvin Ransey, Ohio State
 Jeff Ruland, Iona
 Ralph Sampson, Virginia
 DeWayne Scales, LSU
 Craig Shelton, Georgetown
 Andre Smith, Nebraska
 Larry Smith, Alcorn State
 Steve Stipanovich, Missouri
 Terry Teagle, Baylor
 Isiah Thomas, Indiana
 Corny Thompson, Connecticut
 James Tillman, Eastern Kentucky
 Andrew Toney, Southwestern Louisiana
 Darnell Valentine, Kansas
 Ronnie Valentine, Old Dominion
 Kiki VanDeWeghe, UCLA
 Jay Vincent, Michigan State
 Hawkeye Whitney, NC State
 Michael Wiley, Long Beach State
 Billy Williams, Clemson
 Buck Williams, Maryland
 Francois Wise, Long Beach State
 Al Wood, North Carolina
 Rudy Woods, Texas A&M
 Mike Woodson, Indiana
 Orlando Woolridge, Notre Dame

Academic All-Americans
On April 18, 1980, CoSIDA announced the 1980 Academic All-America team.  The following is the 1979–80 Academic All-America Men's Basketball Team as selected by CoSIDA:

References

NCAA Men's Basketball All-Americans
All-Americans